These are the official results of the Women's Discus Throw event at the 2001 World Championships in Edmonton, Alberta, Canada. There were a total number of 22 participating athletes, with the final held on Saturday 11 August 2001. The qualification mark was set at 63.00 metres.

Ellina Zvereva won the gold medal at 40 years and 269 days old. She is, as of 2017, the oldest World Champion ever.

Medalists

Schedule
All times are Mountain Standard Time (UTC-7)

Abbreviations
All results shown are in metres

Records

Startlist

Qualification

Group A

Group B

Final

References

 Results
 IAAF

D
Discus throw at the World Athletics Championships
2001 in women's athletics